Makea Te Vaerua Ariki (b?–1857) was a sovereign of the Cook Islands. She was the ariki (queen or high chiefess) of the Makea Nui (Great Makea) dynasty, one of the three chiefdoms of the Te Au O Tonga tribe on the island of Rarotonga.

Makea Te Vaerua succeeded her elder brother Makea Davida with the involvement of the missionaries and her village was the headquarters of the mission. She was the first female to succeed the title of ariki, even though she had surviving younger brothers. Hers was a peaceful reign. She supported the work of the mission and was very hospitable to all the missionaries of her time. She married the Tahitian missionary Tiberio (also known as Rio).

She was the eldest daughter of Makea Pori Ariki and the birth-mother of Makea Takau. She was succeeded after her death by her younger brother, Makea Daniela.

See also
History of the Cook Islands
House of Ariki

References

External links
Genealogy of the Kings of Rarotonga
Kings of Rarotonga, as given by the 'wise men' of Makea and Tinomana in 1869
 

People from Rarotonga
Rarotongan monarchs
Royalty of the Cook Islands
19th-century women rulers
Year of birth unknown
1857 deaths
Converts to Christianity from pagan religions